Donnell Smith is former defensive end in the National Football League. He was drafted by the Green Bay Packers in the fifth round of the 1971 NFL Draft and played with the team that season. After a season away from the NFL, he played two seasons with the New England Patriots.

References

Sportspeople from Lakeland, Florida
Green Bay Packers players
New England Patriots players
American football defensive ends
Southern Jaguars football players
1949 births
Living people
Southern California Sun players